A. ehrenbergi may refer to:

 Anemeca ehrenbergi, a Mexican butterfly
 Atys ehrenbergi, a sea snail

See also

 A. ehrenbergii (disambiguation)